Deniz Giafer (born 11 May 2001) is a Romanian professional footballer who plays as a centre back for Dinamo București.

Club career

Dinamo București
While a junior at Dinamo in 2017, Giafer traveled to Portugal club Benfica for a trial and he came close to sign for them, but the transfer failed due to Dinamo's demands. He made his Liga I debut for Dinamo București against FC Voluntari on 19 July 2021.

Career statistics

Club

Personal life
He is of Tatar descent like Denis Alibec.

References

External links
 
 

2001 births
Living people
Sportspeople from Constanța
Romanian footballers
Association football midfielders
FC Dinamo București players
Liga I players
Romania youth international footballers
Romanian people of Crimean Tatar descent